Royce Pollard (born June 3, 1989) is an American football wide receiver who is currently a free agent. He was signed by the New York Jets as an undrafted free agent in 2012. He played college football at Hawaiʻi.

Early years
Pollard attended University City High School in San Diego, California. He was San Diego Union-Tribune scholar-athlete in 2007.

College career
Pollard played college football at the University of Hawaii. He finished college with 154 receptions, 2,140 receiving yards and 15 receiving touchdowns along with 342 kick return yards.

In his freshman year, Pollard played 8 games, and he finished the season with 4 receptions and 71 receiving yards.

In his sophomore year, he had 15 receptions and 157 receiving yards in 8 games. On September 30, 2009, he had a season-high 7 receptions for 84 yards and a season-high 146 kick return yards against Louisiana Tech.

In his junior year, In 14 games, he had 64 receptions, 901 receiving yards and 7 touchdowns. On September 2, 2010, in the season opener against USC, in which he had 7 receptions for 106 yards. In the next game against Army, he recorded 5 receptions for 94 yards and a touchdown on September 11, 2010. On October 9, 2010, he recorded 8 receptions for 96 yards against Fresno State. On November 20, 2010, in a game against San Jose State in which he recorded 4 receptions for 97 yards and touchdown.

In his senior year, he played 12 games in which he had a 71 receptions, 1,011 receiving yards and 8 touchdowns. He was named to the 2011 second-team all-WAC after his senior season. On September 10, 2011, he had 8 receptions for 128 yards against Washington. On September 24, 2011, he had 9 receptions for 145 yards against UC Davis. The next game against Louisiana Tech in which he had a career-high 10 receptions for a career-high 216 receiving yards and 3 receiving touchdowns on October 1, 2011. On October 29, 2011, he tied a season-high and career high 10 receptions for 151 receiving yards against Idaho.

Professional career

New York Jets
On May 6, 2012, he was signed by the New York Jets as an undrafted free agent. On August 30, 2012, he suffered a torn labrum during preseason. On August 31, he was released on the day of final roster cuts. On September 1, 2012, he was signed to the practice squad.
On September 12, 2012, he was released from the practice squad after the team signed Wide receiver Stanley Arukwe to the practice squad. On September 17, 2012, he was signed to the team's practice squad after the team released Stanley Arukwe from the practice squad.

Pollard signed a reserve/future contract with the team on December 31, 2012. He was released on May 12, 2013.

Cleveland Gladiators
Pollard was assigned to the Cleveland Gladiators of the Arena Football League on November 21, 2013.

Los Angeles KISS
On October 28, 2014, Pollard was traded to the Los Angeles KISS for future considerations. Pollard was placed on reassignment on March 22, 2015.

Hamilton Tiger-Cats
On April 25, 2017, Pollard signed a free-agent contract with the  Hamilton Tiger-Cats of the Canadian Football League

References

External links
Hawaii Warriors bio
New York Jets bio

1989 births
Living people
American football wide receivers
Hawaii Rainbow Warriors football players
New York Jets players
Players of American football from San Diego
Players of American football from Honolulu
Cleveland Gladiators players
Los Angeles Kiss players